Singapore competed at the 2022 World Aquatics Championships in Budapest, Hungary from 18 June to 3 July.

Artistic swimming 

Singapore entered 11 artistic swimmers.

Women

Open water swimming

Singapore entered 5 open water swimmers (2 male and 3 female )

Men

Women

Mixed

Swimming 

Singapore entered 14 swimmers.
 Men

 Women

 Mixed

References 

Nations at the 2022 World Aquatics Championships
World Aquatics Championships
2022